Maiden Castle or the Maiden's Castle may refer to:

Historical fortifications in England 
Maiden derives from the Celtic Mai Dun which means 'great hill'.
Maiden Castle, Cheshire, an Iron Age hill fort
Maiden Castle, Cumbria, a Roman fortlet
Maiden Castle, Dorset, an Iron Age hill fort
Maiden Castle, Durham, an Iron Age promontory fort
Maiden Castle, North Yorkshire, an Iron Age settlement

Other
Maiden Castle (Iran), an alternative name for Ghal'eh Dokhtar in Iran
Maiden Castle (novel), 1936 novel by English writer John Cowper Powys
Maiden Castle sports centre, university sports complex in Durham, England

See also
Maiden (disambiguation)
Castle of the Maidens, an alternative name for Edinburgh Castle in Scotland
Mai-Dun, a symphonic rhapsody of 1921 by composer John Ireland